Nicostratus (Νικόστρατος) was a Greek playwright of the Middle Comedy.  He was said to be the youngest son of Aristophanes. Photius claims that Nicostratus leaped from the Leucadian Rock due to an unrequited love for a woman named Tettigidaea from Myrrinous and was "cured" of his love.

Surviving titles and fragments
The following twenty three titles, along with associated fragments, are all that survive of Nicostratus' work:

 Favorite Slave
 Female Love-Rival
 Antyllus
 Man Being Driven Away
 Kings
 The Accuser
 Hecate
 Hesiod
 The Hierophant
 The Bed
 Laconians
 The Cook
 Oenopion
 The Bird-Catcher
 Pandarus
 Pandrosus
 Woman Swimming Alongside
 Citizens
 Wealth
 The Syrian
 The Moneylender
 The Falsely-Branded
 The Bustard-Bird

References

Ancient Greek dramatists and playwrights
Middle Comic poets